First Love is a 1921 American silent romantic comedy film produced by the Realart Pictures Corporation and distributed through the related Paramount Pictures. It stars Constance Binney and was directed by Maurice Campbell. Warner Baxter has one of his earliest screen portrayals here. Only the first reel of this film is known to survive at the Museum of Modern Art.

Plot
As described in a film magazine, factory worker Kathleen O'Donnell (Binney) has fallen in love with ambulance driver Harry Stanton (Webb). After her father Tad O'Donnell (Hernandez), who knows Harry's true character, forbids him in the house, Kathleen leaves home and works overtime at the factory for funds for Harry to complete his medical education, a course of study which exists only in fiction. The efforts of her family and other employees to show her error lead her to quit her factory job and take a job as a waitress at a restaurant, where she sees him dining with his lady friends. Her discovery of his perfidy results in an attack on him that injures his sight. She later has a happy ending as the owner of the factory Donald Halliday (Baxter) has an interest in her.

Cast
Constance Binney as Kathleen O'Donnell
Warner Baxter as Donald Halliday
George Webb as Harry Stanton
Betty Schade as Yvette De Vonne
George Hernandez as Tad O'Donnell
Fanny Midgley as Mrs. O'Donnell (credited as Fannie Midgley)
Edward Jobson as Peter Holliday
Agnes Adams as Icecream-cone Girl
Maxine Elliott Hicks as Speeder
Dorothy Gordon as Elsie Edwards

Summary in stills
The December 24, 1921 issue of Exhibitors Herald illustrated the plot of First Love using a series of twenty numbered stills presented without any explanatory captions. The order of the stills may altered from that of the film since stills 10 and 16 appear to be from the same scene (the apron may indicate that these are from when she was working as a waitress at a restaurant) and 9 and 19 show Binney sitting with the same hair style.

References

External links

1921 films
American silent feature films
Paramount Pictures films
1921 romantic comedy films
American romantic comedy films
American black-and-white films
Lost American films
Films directed by Maurice Campbell
1921 lost films
1920s American films
Silent romantic comedy films
Silent American comedy films